EFG Hermes Holding S.A.E. (Egyptian Financial Group Hermes Holding Company) is an Egyptian financial services company present in the Middle East, North Africa, Sub-Saharan Africa, and South Asia regions and specializes in securities brokerage, asset management, investment banking, private equity and research in addition to finance lease, factoring, microfinance, Financial technology, mortgage, and insurance.  EFG Hermes serves a range of clients including sovereign wealth funds, endowments, corporations, financial institutions, high-net-worth clients and individual customers. EFG Hermes is listed on the Egyptian Exchange (EGX) and London (LSE) stock exchanges.  EFG Hermes has offices in Egypt, the United Arab Emirates (UAE), the Kingdom of Saudi Arabia (KSA), Pakistan, Oman, Kuwait, Jordan , Kenya, Nigeria, UK, United States and Bangladesh with over 4,500 people from 25 nationalities. They serve clients from the Middle East, North Africa, Europe and the United States.

History
EFG, also known as the Egyptian Financial Group, became the first investment banking firm in Egypt when it was established by Dr Mohamed Taymour in 1984. Hermes was founded in 1993 under the newly promulgated Capital Markets Law 95. EFG created and analyzed privatization plans for the Egyptian government for several years. In 1993, The Egyptian Financial Group and Hermes independently made a move into securities brokerage. The two companies competed and both companies brought many investment strategies that were common to the west to Egypt as several of the two firm's founders had Wall Street experience in corporate finance, sales & trading and asset management;, for example Hermes established the first equity index in all of Egypt.

In 1994, both Egyptian Financial Group and Hermes entered into asset management. Fueled by organic growth; the two firms also accounted for lead managing a majority of the privatization capital markets IPO's during 1995 and 1996.  The two companies soon reached the point that further growth was not possible without a wider network of local and international clients on one hand, as well as the rising competitive threat of international investment banks in the progressively more active Egyptian market in terms of investment banking privatization transactions as well as higher trading volumes . These factors led to a merger in 1996 between EFG and Hermes.

Financial Performance 

Structure
EFG Hermes has five Divisions and six subsidiaries under its finance platform

Securities Brokerage
EFG Hermes Securities Brokerage is the leading brokerage house in the Arab world. With the region's largest brokerage team, the division caters to an extended spectrum of investors including foreign, local and Gulf institutions as well as individual, VIP, high-net-worth individuals and family offices. The division's products and services range from trading services including phone trading, online trading, SWAP/P-Note products trading and margin lending for Egyptian retail investors.

Asset Management
EFG Hermes Asset Management serves a client base that includes sovereign wealth funds, endowments, foundations, multinational corporations and family offices. The division employs professionals in portfolio management, trading, research, compliance and risk across its 3 locations in Egypt, UAE (Dubai) and Saudi Arabia. The division has consistently delivered superior returns across its broad and diverse product spectrum.

Private Equity
EFG Hermes Private Equity is a private equity house, with a presence in Cairo and Dubai. The division is focused on attractive investment opportunities that capitalise on different opportunities in and outside the MENA region. EFG Hermes Private Equity advised InfraMed, the largest investment vehicle dedicated to infrastructure investments in the Southern and Eastern Mediterranean. The firm was also one of five global and regional founding sponsors that together contributed EUR 385 million to establish InfraMed. In late 2014, EFG Hermes launched Vortex - its renewable energy vehicle - to invest in solar and wind energy projects across Europe and Asia.

Investment Banking
EFG Hermes Investment Banking is an advisor for major M&A, debt and equity transactions. The division's investment professionals have advised on cross-border transactions in the region through a distribution network that encompasses more than 100 investors across North America, Europe, the Middle East and Africa. The Investment Banking team has completed some US$53.3 billion in M&A transactions since 1985 while raising more than US$19 million through initial public offerings, rights issues, secondary offerings and private placements in the same period.

Research
EFG Hermes Research division offers its clients coverage of MENA markets, including more than 150 companies representing c. 60% of the region's aggregate market capitalisation. The team offers economics and strategy coverage of 11 key countries in the Arab world. Products include equity research, strategy and macro-strategy notes, sector overviews, economic notes, industrial research and country-specific economic and banking data reports.

Strategy
EFG Hermes global strategy relies heavily on expanding in frontier emerging markets FEM. Therefore, the company has made its priority to enter into the major financial hubs of the Middle-East, namely Egypt, the United Arab Emirates, Saudi Arabia, Qatar, Oman, Kuwait and Lebanon. Further expansions focused on key African financial hubs such as Kenya as a hub for East Africa and Nigeria as a hub for West Africa.

United Arab Emirates
EFG Hermes launched its brokerage activities in the UAE in early 2005, and by early 2007 had captured dominant market share on Dubai Financial Market. The firm is also the top ranked broker on the Abu Dhabi Securities Market, Dubai Financial Market and Nasdaq Dubai.

In December 2005, EFG Hermes was granted a license by the Dubai International Financial Centre to conduct asset management and investment banking activities. EFG Hermes UAE is regulated in this capacity by the Dubai Financial Services Authority, an independent regulatory authority that operates to the standards of major financial centers such as London and New York City. Out of Dubai, the firm manages the region's top performing funds and has closed a number of landmark investment banking transactions. In February 2006, EFG Hermes UAE was also granted a license to conduct brokerage activities from within the Dubai International Financial Centre and became the first regional trading, clearing and custody member of the Dubai International Financial Exchange, its wholesale exchange.

Kingdom of Saudi Arabia
EFG Hermes was granted a license from the Capital Market Authority (Saudi Arabia) to launch its operations in the Kingdom of Saudi Arabia in March 2007 offering securities brokerage, investment banking, asset management and research services in the largest investment market in the region. The brokerage arm reached the #1 position among the 12 independent brokerage companies, despite having started trading properly only in the third quarter of 2007.

Pakistan
EFG Hermes, inaugurated its office in Pakistan, making it the first foreign investment bank to directly enter the market since 2008 and the first foreign broker to have a local footprint in the country. The opening followed the firm's acquisition of Pakistani brokerage Invest and Finance Securities Ltd., which began operating as EFG Hermes Pakistan Limited.

Oman
In April 2008, EFG Hermes acquired 51% of Vision Securities in Oman at a PE ratio of 11.5 compared to EFG Hermes’ PE ratio of 16.6. EFG Hermes has long since accounted for substantial flows into the Omani market on behalf of its foreign institutional clients, and is able to serve a broader base of clients from its presence on the ground in Oman.

Kuwait
EFG Hermes IFA, the brokerage arm of EFG Hermes in Kuwait, is a brokerage firm on the Kuwait Stock Exchange (KSE) with a client base including a wide array of retail, VIP and high-net-worth clients, as well as local, regional, and international institutional investors. EFG Hermes IFA provides the full range of brokerage services including an online trading platform.

The firm has maintained its position as the top brokerage firm in Kuwait.

Jordan
Since inception, EFG Hermes Jordan has maintained a client base of around 6,000 investors by the end of 1H2017 ranging from retail, VIP, high net worth clients, local and regional institutions as well as foreign institutional investors. The firm offers its client base access to senior and executive management teams of publicly listed companies, promoting a business-friendly climate in Jordan. Moreover, EFG Hermes Jordan is the only local broker that has the support of a large and dedicated research division that publishes thorough fundamental analysis, sector analysis and strategy reports on the country and the market. Currently, the research team covers five of the largest listed companies that represent a market capitalization of 45%.

Kenya
EFG Hermes Kenya launched its operations in 2017, being the firm’s first foray into Sub-Saharan Africa in a step that will serve as an East African hub into more neighboring markets. The company provides securities brokerage, research and corporate advisory services spanning Kenya and neighboring markets.

Nigeria
In 2018, EFG Hermes expanded its global presence into the largest economy in West Africa through the acquisition of Primera Africa Securities Limited, now EFG Hermes Nigeria Limited. EFG Hermes Nigeria is licensed by the Securities and Exchange Commission and the Nigerian Stock Exchange to carry out brokerage and research coverage services.

United States
EFG Hermes USA, Inc. is a subsidiary of EFG Hermes Holding and is a member of FINRA and SIPC. The office was established to serve Western institutional clients residing in North America and provides coverage of 75 frontier emerging markets (FEM) or 100% of FTSE's FEM index to its clients.

Bangladesh
EFG Hermes Bangladesh was inaugurated as rep office in Dhaka, the capital city of Bangladesh, to serve the firm’s network of global institutional clients. The addition of Bangladesh to the firm’s frontier platform came as part of EFG Hermes’ drive to expand representation in high-potential frontier emerging markets.

Vietnam
EFG Hermes entered an agreement in 2019 with ACBS - the securities brokerage arm of ACB Asia Commercial Bank of Vietnam to offer its clients on-ground access to the local capital markets.

References

External links
Abraaj Capital. Investor Relations. Retrieved September 28, 2006
Arab Decision, Egypt, other Financial Institutions
Atlas Investment Group. Jordan Country Report. Retrieved October 3, 2006
Ameinfo. UAE retail investors moving online as market grows
American University. Sources and links. Retrieved September 1, 2006
Bank Audi. Jordanian Economic Report. Retrieved August 29, 2006
Center for administrative Innovation in the Euro-Mediterranean Region. Jordan Administrative Reform, Innovation and Maintenance 
Central Intelligence Agency (2004). The World Fact Book. Retrieved on October 3, 2006 
EFG Hermes. Investor Relations. Retrieved on September 14, 2006
Library of Congress, Federal Research Division, Country Studies. Jordan. Retrieved October 3, 2006
Moussa Najla. Abraaj Capital makes offer on EFG Hermes Shares. Retrieved November 20, 2006 
2006 Jordan Index of Economic Freedom, The Heritage Foundation, Retrieved August 29, 2006 
Saban Center for Middle East Policy. Luncheon Address: Suhair Al-Ali. Retrieved October 17, 2006, from Miller Reporting Co

Financial services companies established in 1984
Banks established in 1984
Investment banks
Private equity firms of the Middle East
Conglomerate companies of Egypt